The 2014–15 season was the 118th season of competitive football in Scotland. The domestic season began on 26 July 2014, with the start of the Challenge Cup. The 2014–15 Scottish Professional Football League season commenced on 9 August, the weekend after the conclusion of the 2014 Commonwealth Games.

Transfer deals

League competitions

Scottish Premiership

Scottish Championship

Scottish League One

Scottish League Two

Non-league football

Level 5

Level 6

SPFL Development League

Honours

Cup honours

Non-league honours

Senior

Junior
West Region

East Region

North Region

Individual honours

PFA Scotland awards

SFWA awards

Scottish clubs in Europe

Celtic
Celtic played their first two home European ties in 2014–15 at Murrayfield Stadium in Edinburgh because their normal home stadium, Celtic Park, was used for the opening ceremony of the 2014 Commonwealth Games. In their third qualifying round tie, Celtic lost 4–1 to Legia Warsaw in Poland and 2–0 at Murrayfield, which appeared to give Legia a 6–1 aggregate victory. The result of the second game was annulled by UEFA because Legia had fielded a player who should have been serving a suspension. Celtic were instead given a 3–0 victory in the second leg, which meant that they won the tie on the away goals rule. Celtic progressed to the Champions League playoff round, but then dropped into the Europa League groups after losing 2–1 on aggregate to Slovenian club Maribor.

2014–15 UEFA Champions League

2014–15 UEFA Europa League

Aberdeen
2014–15 UEFA Europa League

Motherwell
2014–15 UEFA Europa League

St Johnstone
2014–15 UEFA Europa League

Scotland national team

Women's football

Scottish Women's Premier League

League and Cup honours

Individual honours

SWPL awards

UEFA Women's Champions League

Glasgow City

Qualifying round
Group 4
Matches

Knockout Phase

Scotland women's national team

Deaths
4 July: Andy Jardine, 78, Dumbarton fullback.
11 July: Jim Geddes, 84, Motherwell defender and midfielder.
21 July: Stewart Hillis, 70, Scotland national team doctor.
22 July: Morris Stevenson, 71, Motherwell, Hibernian, Morton, Dundee United and Berwick Rangers inside forward.
28 July: Alex Forbes, 89, Scotland wing half.
17 August: Sammy Conn, 52, Falkirk, Albion Rovers, Clydebank, Airdrieonians and Cowdenbeath midfielder and Cowdenbeath manager.
27 August: Bobby Kinloch, 79, Hibernian, Greenock Morton, Berwick Rangers, Raith Rovers and Dunfermline Athletic player.
4 September: Willie Finlay, 88, East Fife, Clyde and Raith Rovers defender.
21 September: Tim Whalen, 83, Dumbarton forward.
22 September: Billy Neil, 75, Airdrieonians and Queen's Park defender.
23 September: John Divers, 74, Celtic and Partick Thistle forward.
30 September: Hugh Doherty, 93, Celtic winger.
25 October: Gerry Burrell, 90, St Mirren and Dundee winger.
26 October: Jim Sharkey, 80, Celtic, Airdrieonians and Raith Rovers forward.
29 October: Archie Murphy, 81, Alloa Athletic wing-half.
November: Alex Bain, 78, Motherwell and Falkirk centre forward 
8 November: Sammy Wilson, 82, St Mirren and Celtic inside forward.
9 November: Sammy Reid, 75, Motherwell, Falkirk, Clyde, Berwick Rangers and Dumbarton inside forward.
13 November: Jim Storrie, 74, Airdrie, Aberdeen and St Mirren centre forward; St Johnstone manager.
26 November: Arthur Montford, 85, Scotsport commentator.
1 December: Jimmy Duncan, 83, Celtic, St Mirren, Albion Rovers, Dundee United and Stranraer winger.
7 December: Tommy Todd, 88, Hamilton Academical inside forward.
7 December: Tom Mealyou, Berwick Rangers goalkeeper.
12 December: John Baxter, 78, Hibernian, Falkirk and Clydebank wing half.
19 December: Pat Holton, 78, Hamilton, Motherwell and St Johnstone full back.
31 December: Jimmy Dunn, 91, Wolves and Derby County forward.
4 January: John McPhee, 77, Motherwell defender.
14 January: Danny Malloy, 84, Dundee and Clyde defender.
21 January: Douglas Cromb, 84, Hibernian chairman.
29 January: Derek Robertson, 65, St Johnstone goalkeeper.
8 February: Nick Sharkey, 71, Sunderland forward.
10 February: Tom McQueen, 85, Leith Athletic, Alloa, Hibs, East Fife, Berwick Rangers and Stranraer goalkeeper.
23 February: Andy King, 72, Kilmarnock defender.
1 March: Stuart McGrady, 29, Ayr United and Queen's Park striker.
2 March: Dave Mackay, 80, Hearts and Scotland wing half.
20 March: Eddie Mulheron, 72, Clyde defender.
5 April: Turnbull Hutton, 68, Raith Rovers chairman.
16 April: Tommy Preston, 82, Hibernian forward.
29 April: Gary Liddell, 60, Hearts forward.
11 May: John Hewie, 87, Scotland defender.
13 May: Eric Bakie, 87, Aberdeen, Dunfermline and St Johnstone wing half.
19 May: Joe Carr, 83, St Johnstone and Dumbarton winger.
21 May: Ernie Hannigan, 72, Queen of the South and Morton winger.
4 June: Jørgen Ravn, 75, Aberdeen forward.
6 June: Colin Jackson, 68, Rangers, Morton, Partick Thistle and Scotland defender.
7 June: Stephen Gove, 55, Brechin City forward.

Notes and references

 
Seasons in Scottish football